Taito A. Kantonen (24 April 1900 – 26 April 1993) was an American academic and theologian.

Early life and education 
Kantonen was born in Karstula, Finland, the son of David and Elli Kantonen. At the age of three, he moved to the United States, where he later attended Harvard University and received a degree in theology.

Career 
Kantonen was a professor of systematic theology in Hamma Divinity School (now Trinity Lutheran Seminary) from 1932 to 1968. He received an honorary doctorate in theology from the University of Helsinki in 1955. Kantonen wrote many books, including Man in the Eyes of God.

Death 
Kantonen died in Springfield, Ohio on 26 April 1993, two days after his 93rd birthday.

References

Notes
 The back Cover Sheet of his book "The Christian Hope" says he was "the American member of the Lutheran World Federation's Commission on Theology." It lists other books he wrote as: "Theology of Evangelism" - "Lutheran Theology in the Contemporary Scene" and "Resurgence of the Gospel."

1900 births
1993 deaths
American non-fiction writers
American theologians
Finnish emigrants to the United States (1809–1917)
Finnish writers
Harvard Divinity School alumni
Writers from Springfield, Ohio
Finnish emigrants to the United States
20th-century American writers